The 1955–56 Romanian Hockey League season was the 26th season of the Romanian Hockey League. Four teams participated in the league, and CCA Bucuresti won the championship.

Regular season

External links
hochei.net

Rom
Romanian Hockey League seasons
1955–56 in Romanian ice hockey